Metro (Serbian Cyrillic: Метро) was a Serbian and former Yugoslav hard rock band from Jagodina.

Band history
Metro was formed in September 1981 in Jagodina, by brothers Ivan "Ivica" Maksimović (guitar), Petar "Pera" Maksimović (bass guitar) and Branko "Brix" Savić (vocals). The default lineup also featured Zdravo Lalić (drums) and Saša Krstić (keyboards). Metro saw larger media attention after their performances at the 1982 Festival Omladina in Subotica, on which they won the Audience's Choice Second Prize, and Belgrade Rock Festival.

In 1983, the band released their debut album, Čupave glave (Hairy Heads) through PGP-RTB. During the same year, the band performed as the opening act for Divlje Jagode on their Serbian tour, and on March 18, 1983, they performed as the opening act for British heavy metal band Saxon, on their concert in Belgrade Pionir Hall.

In May 1983, the Maksimović brothers and Lalić left the band. Savić  continued to lead the new Metro lineup, until May 1985, when the band broke up.

1991-1997
The band reunited July in 1991, with Savić on vocals and a new lineup. In 1995, the band released their second, more heavy metal-oriented album Eksplozija (Explosion), through ITMM. The band performed on all Gitarijada festivals held from 1993 to 1997 and frequently performed at motorcycle clubs' gatherings, until 1997, when it disbanded once more.

2010 activities
In early 2010, Branko Savić, Ivan Maksimović and Petar Maksimović recorded the song "Ona je kao zver" ("She's Like a Best"), which remained officially unreleased, but can be heard on YouTube.

In 2016.until today Branko Savić with new lineup started work again. 

Petar Maksimovic died on June 19, 2014. On the 8th of November 2019, Ivan Maksimović also died.

Discography

Studio albums
Čupave glave (1983)
Eksplozija (1995)

Singles
"Ona je kao zver" (2010)

References

External links
 Metro at Discogs
 Metro at Encyclopaedia Metallum

Serbian hard rock musical groups
Serbian heavy metal musical groups
Yugoslav hard rock musical groups
Yugoslav heavy metal musical groups
Musical groups established in 1981